Thank God You're Here is a partially improvised comedy television program, based on the Australian TV show, broadcast by NBC. The show was hosted by David Alan Grier and presided over by judge Dave Foley. The pilot was shot on November 9, 2006, and NBC initially ordered six episodes. The show debuted with a two-hour, double-episode premiere on Monday, April 9, 2007, at 9pm ET. It was produced by FremantleMedia North America, with Cécile Frot-Coutaz, CEO of Fremantle, Fax Bahr, and Adam Small as executive producers.

The show aired on Mondays for its first 2 weeks. It was moved to Wednesdays on April 18, 2007.

On May 14, 2007, after the initial order of 7 episodes aired, the series was officially cancelled by NBC.

Summary
Thank God You're Here showcased the improvisational skills of a group of four actors each week, as they walked into a live sketch without having seen a script for it. The only clue the actors had as to the content of the sketch, and the role they would be playing within the sketch, was their costume.

Upon entering the sketch, the actors were greeted with "Thank God you're here!" from another actor in the sketch. Outside of the principal actor, all actors in the sketch had a script which they more or less followed, depending on the improvisations.  Sketches had no set ending point — instead, they went on until the judge (Foley) stopped them with a buzzer. Also, in each episode one of the skits would feature David Alan Grier in a surprise cameo.

At the end of the show, the judge chose a winner from among the four actor contestants.  The winner was awarded a trophy.  Unlike the Australian version, no honorable or dishonorable mentions were chosen.

Cast
 David Alan Grier — Host
 Dave Foley — Judge
 Chris Tallman – Ensemble
 Maribeth Monroe – Ensemble
 Brian Palermo – Ensemble
 Nyima Funk - Ensemble

List of episodes

Episode 1: April 9, 2007 (9 PM)

Episode 2: April 9, 2007 (10 PM)

Episode 3: April 16, 2007

Episode 4: April 18, 2007

Episode 5: May 2, 2007

Episode 6: May 9, 2007

Episode 7: May 16, 2007

References

External links
 Official Website
 

2007 American television series debuts
2007 American television series endings
2000s American sketch comedy television series
NBC original programming
Television series by Fremantle (company)
American television series based on Australian television series
Improvisational television series